A rolling chassis is the fully-assembled chassis of a motor vehicle (car, truck, bus, or other vehicle) without its bodywork. It is equipped with running gear (engine and drivetrain) and ready for delivery to a coachbuilder to be completed.  Historically, bespoke luxury automobiles were finished inside and out to an owner's specifications by a coachbuilder, and specialty vehicles (such as fire engines) were outfitted by firms devoted to that task.

Heavy vehicles

Separate chassis remain in use for almost all heavy vehicles ranging from pickup trucks to the biggest trucks and commercial passenger carrying vehicles.

The rolling chassis is delivered to the commercial body maker, coachbuilder, or bulk transporter on its own wheels, under its own power.

Automobiles

Rolling chassis was a stage of manufacture of every vehicle. Mass produced cars were supplied complete from the factory, but luxury cars like Rolls-Royce were supplied as a chassis from the factory to several bespoke coachbuilders like J Gurney Nutting & Co who would supply a body to the customer's order (or build a car which was sold from their showroom).    

Automobile construction methods changed when unibody or monocoque combined chassis and body structures gradually replaced chassis.

Gallery

See also

Glider (automobiles), an otherwise complete motor vehicle that lacks some or all of the powertrain

Vehicle technology